Football at the Inter-Allied Games was an unofficial football event organized by the United States military and the YMCA. It took place in June 1919, a year after the cessation of hostilities on the western front, and all the matches were played at the newly constructed Stade Pershing in Paris. The tournament featured some of Europe’s top players. The Inter-Allied Games is the first football tournament, official or otherwise, with national teams from two different continents. 

For this tournament, were invited teams from all the countries who had been on the winning side in the war as to celebrate their victory. Eight national teams participated in the competition: Belgium, Canada, Czechoslovakia, hosts France, Greece, Italy, Romania and the United States.

Czechoslovakia, whose participation in the Allied-Games represented the first major international sporting appearance for the newly created nation, went on to make a memorable campaign, winning the tournament and finishing unbeaten. Along with Czechoslovakia, the Allied-Games was also the first taste of international football to Romania and Greece, but because the matches played in Paris are not recognized by FIFA or the International Olympic Committee, and therefore, they are not considered official international matches, the countries official debuts only came at the 1920 Olympics, for Romania came in 1922 and for Greece it only came 10 years later, in 1929.

Venues
The venue was the newly constructed Stade Pershing in Paris, a gift to France from the American people.

Squads

 for the Inter-Allied Games in Paris, 1919.
According to the regulations, the athletes who could take part in the competitions were those in active military service in the armies of the Allied countries or who had been in military service in the armies of the Allied countries during the War, and a significant number of players of the highest level met these criteria, many of whom being players of the national teams, which means that this tournament featured some of Europe’s top players. The Winning Forces of WWI assembled football teams for this tournament, resulting in 8 participants:

 : The USA team was selected from among the participants in the American Expeditionary Forces Championship held the month before, which was contested by sections of the American Expeditionary Forces and won by the Le Mans by 80th Division. The U.S. army was willing to return soldiers who had already been demobilized back to the U.S. when they thought it gave them the best chance to win an event, but such a policy did not seem to apply to soccer and instead most of the returned athletes competed in track and field events. In contrast to this approach other nations turned out strong teams featuring some of the continent’s top players.

 : Team Canada was also formed by members of their own Expeditionary Force. In addition to a number of leading Canadian football players, it also included several former British players who emigrated to Canada, such as Samuel Gough and Douglas Thomson, who were both twice wounded during the war, Charles Hutchinson was shot in the left arm during the Second Battle of Ypres in 1915, which resulted in a fracture of the humerus, but their most well-known player was Alf Spouncer, who had won the FA Cup once in 1898 with Nottingham Forest.

 : The Czechoslovakian team was made up largely of players taken from the club Slavia Prague, the traditional champions of Czechoslovakia, and the Czech team that reached the gold medal match of the 1920 Olympics (which they lost 2–0 to hosts, Belgium) included thirteen players from the Inter-Allied roster, the most of any nation that competed in both tournaments. The top star of the side being forward Antonín Janda, who was the tournament's shared top goal scorer with 7 goals. Others top Czech players who appeared in both the Inter-Allied games and the Olympics were Defender Antonín Hojer and midfielder Václav Pilát.

 : Belgium also had a very good team, with at least six players from the 1919 side going on to help the country win gold at the 1920 Olympics. Among the leading figures on both teams was Armand Swartenbroeks.

 : Nine players from this team played for the national team, and five at the 1920 Olympics. The top stars of their side were forward Paul Nicolas, who was the tournament's shared top goal scorer with 7 goals, and goalkeeper Pierre Chayriguès, who managed to not concede a single goal in the group stage, including a clean-sheet against Italy. Former Real Madrid player René Petit was also part of this team.

 : Five players from this team played in the 1920 Olympics, and almost all the other players played in the national team at some point. The players who led the line for the Italians were Enrico Sardi, Luigi Cevenini, and Swiss-born forward Ermanno Aebi, who despite having Swiss citizenship he volunteered for military service in Italy which explains his appearance at the Inter-Allied games. The Italian team also included the likes of Aristodemo Santamaria and Guiseppe Asti.

 : The star of the Greek national team that participated in the Inter-Allied Games was Giorgos Kalafatis, in fact, Greece's team having the leading conscripted Greek footballers at the tournament was based on the initiative from Kalafatis. In Paris, Kalafatis collected information about basketball and volleyball (sports unknown then in Greece), and after his return to Athens, he started his efforts on creating basketball and volleyball teams with Panathinaikos. He was also a player/manager for Greece in the 1920 Olympic Games in Antwerp.

 : The Romania football team at the Games was drawn almost exclusively from Bucharest, and no ethnic Hungarians were involved (it did, however, include a German and an Englishman). In goal for Romania was the 22-year-old Constantin Rădulescu, who would later select and/or coach the Romanian national team at the first three World Cups, and would be a prime mover in the establishment of the Romanian Football Federation (FRF) in 1923 and the divisional league system (Alexandru Săvulescu, who would later be on the staff with Rădulescu at two World Cups, was also a member of this team).

Format
The 8 teams were organized into two groups of four. Each team played each other once and each team was awarded 2 points for a win, 1 for a draw, and 0 for a loss, and the winners of the groups would meet in the final, where the winner of the tournament would be determined.

Summary
Group A contained France, Italy, Greece and Romania while the other consisted of the United States, Canada, Czechoslovakia and Belgium. In Group A, both France and Italy defeated Greece and Romania comfortably, meaning that the ticket to the final would be decided between them in the last match of the group, which was won by France 2–0, thus finishing the group without conceding a single goal, in part thanks to the good performances of their goalkeeper Pierre Chayriguès. Greece was trashed 0–9 and 0–11 by Italy and France respectively, conceding a poker in both games to Luigi Cevenini and Paul Nicolas. The latter also netted twice against Romania and his side's second against Italy to bring his goal tally up to seven.

In group B, the fate of the first place was decided in the very first match between Czechoslovakia and Belgium, a kind of "rehearsal" of the 1920 Olympic final, which ended in a 4–1 win to the Czechs. Czech forwards Antonin Janda and Jan Vaník also found the back of the net in all three matches of the group stage, with Janda netting once in a 4–1 win over Belgium, and twice against both Canada (3–2) and the USA (8–2), thus helping his side top the group and reach the final at the expense of Belgium. They would both score in the final against France as well.

The most dramatic games of the whole tournament were the ones that decided the third spot of each group, a Balkanize derby between Greece and Romania in group A and an American derby between the USA and Canada in group B, and while the former finished with a 3–2 victory to a Greece team that had conceded twenty goals without reply in their two previous games, the later saw Canada lead 4–1, but, as the newspaper Le Liberte pointed out: "...from that moment it began to rain from free kicks and penalties fixed by the American referee of the match in favor of their compatriots". As a result, the US team celebrated a 5–4 victory. The performance of the United States team at the games was not the best as they won only a single game while finishing with a minus-12 goal difference, however, the U.S. team acquitted itself pretty well considering that the American Expeditionary Forces Championship seemed to give little attention to building the strongest possible squad.

Ultimately, Czechoslovakia and France met in the final and after a close match, the Czechs took home the silverware with a 3–2 win.

Results

Group 1

Group 2

Final
The final took place on 29 June in front of a crowd that packed the big stadium. The hosts had their line-up greatly strengthened with the addition of the Gastiger brothers (Maurice and Pierre); however, both teams were forced to make substitutions: After a tough match with the Italians, the French had to change five players, while the Czechoslovak team made two, and also made a shocking shift in their regular line-up by putting Antonín Janda in the backline while a new man, Jaroslav Červený, replaced him on the forward line. However, this change did not pay off as the French took a 2-0 lead with goals from Paul Deydier and Albert Rénier. The Czechs found themselves trailing 2–1 at half-time, and therefore, the second half saw Janda back in his regular position and from then on the team hit its stride, but France strongly contested the Czechoslovak bid for supremacy, and soon, the contest developed into a battle between the Czechoslovak forward line and the French defense, a scenario that proved to be perfect for France's goalkeeper, Pierre Chayriguès to shine, as he put up a spectacular game and electrified the stands with his brilliant stops. However, with less than 10 minutes to go, Janda found an equalizer. He seemed to have just forced extra-time, however, just 5 minutes later, he nets the winner past Chayriguès to give his side a 3–2 win over the hosts. Besides the wonderful work of Janda, the shifty playing of Václav Pilát at the center was also a big factor in the eventual 3-2 victory.
 
The Czechoslovakian team was built around a nucleus of players from Slavia Prague, who was schooled for 25 years by a former Scotch international player, Johnny Madden, and he watched his team triumph from the side-lines. There were no more passionate fans present than the American soldiers and at the conclusion of the game they carried the hard-working Janda from the field on their shoulders. Janda, by his aggressiveness and good sportsmanship, became one of the most popular players of the tournament. Later when arrangements were being made for Sparta to tour the United States in 1926, the terms of the contract reportedly stipulated for Janda to be included in the team even though he had not featured regularly for Sparta in the past two seasons.

Winners

Statistics

Goalscorers

Hat-tricks

See also
 1976 U.S.A. Bicentennial Cup Tournament
 Football at the 1906 Intercalated Games
 Belgium national football team results (unofficial matches)
 Italy national football team results (unofficial matches)
 France national football team results (unofficial matches)
 Romania national football team results (unofficial matches)

Notes

References

External links
RSSSF archives

Olympic football tournaments
1919 in association football
International association football competitions hosted by France
International association football competitions hosted by Paris